The women's 200 metre individual medley event at the 1968 Summer Olympics took place 20 October. This swimming event used medley swimming. Because an Olympic size swimming pool is 50 metres long, this race consisted of four lengths of the pool. The first length was swum using the butterfly stroke, the second with the backstroke, the third length in breaststroke, and the fourth freestyle. Unlike other events using freestyle, swimmers could not use butterfly, backstroke, or breaststroke for the freestyle leg; most swimmers use the front crawl in freestyle events anyway.

Medalists

Results

Heats
Heat 1

Heat 2

Heat 3

Heat 4

Heat 5

Heat 6

Final

Key: DQ = Disqualified, OR = Olympic record

References

Women's individual medley 200 metre
1968 in women's swimming
Women's events at the 1968 Summer Olympics